Hair Fairies is a chain of clinical salons dedicated to the removal of head lice. The company's headquarters are located in Los Angeles, California, and there are Hair Fairies stores in Los Angeles, San Francisco, San Diego, New York City, Fairfield, Burlingame, Seattle, Portland, Dallas, Chicago, and Atlanta. Hair Fairies features a range of natural, non-toxic products that include such ingredients as rosemary, aloe vera, lavender and peppermint oil. Hair Fairies was founded in 1999 by Maria Botham, who is currently the company President.

References

External links 
 
 

Lice
Health care companies established in 1999
1999 establishments in California
Companies based in Los Angeles